John atte Mille (fl. 1380–1395) of Chichester, Sussex, was an English politician.

He was a Member (MP) of the Parliament of England for Chichester in November 1380 and 1395.

References

Year of birth missing
Year of death missing
English MPs November 1380
People from Chichester
English MPs 1395